The Zomi Congress for Democracy (ZCD) is a political party in Myanmar. Most of the party's support comes from Chin State, where the original ZNC was headquartered. The party is most popular in the Tonzang and Tedim Townships, where their headquarters and strongholds are. The party has 15,000 members in Chin State.

History
The ZCD was founded as the Zomi National Congress (ZNC) in Daizang, Manipur, India in 1972. Under the leadership of T. Gougin and S. K. Samte, the organisation campaigned for the unification of the Zomi people in India and Myanmar, and submitted a memorandum to the then President of India V. V. Giri. It was a major goal for the ZNC that the first World Zomi Convention be held at Champhai, Mizoram, India from 19–21 May 1988; a goal which was completed.

In 1988, after the 8888 uprising, the ZNC branch in Burma was registered as a political party. It was permitted to function as a political organisation until 1992, when the military junta abolished the party, and banned it from all political activities.

Chin Sian Thang, 67, was chairman of the Zomi National Congress, until the party's dissolution. Elected as a Member of Parliament during Burma's ill-fated 1990 elections, he worked diligently for several years in defiance of the country’s ruling military junta. During the 1960s, Cin Sian Thang served as a leader of the Chin Ethnic Student Union while a student at Rangoon University. He has been imprisoned on at least six occasions by successive military regimes for his political activities between 1972 and 1999. In each instance, he served two years, during which he was subjected to brutal interrogations and torture, which has led to permanent health problems. He also served as a member of the Committee Representing People’s Parliament, a group supported by 251 candidates elected in 1990. Considered a moderate ethnic leader, Cin Sian Thang heavily promoted the CRPP as a rallying point for Burmese activists and ethnic leaders. He was the most outspoken elected ethnic leader in Myanmar. He is also the co-author of the book "In Burma, a Cry for U.N. Help".

The party renamed to the Zomi Congress for Democracy after new naming restrictions imposed by the government leading up to the 2012 by-elections required them to drop the word 'National' from their name. The party formally registered this name with the Union Election Commission in 2012.

References

Defunct political parties in India
Political parties in Myanmar
Political parties of minorities
1972 establishments in India
1988 establishments in Burma
Political parties established in 1972
Political parties with year of disestablishment missing